was a town located in Asakura District, Fukuoka Prefecture, Japan.

As of 2003, the town has an estimated population of 16,568 and a density of 364.37 persons per km². The total area is 45.47 km².

On March 22, 2005, Yasu, along with the town of Miwa (also from Asakura District), was merged to create the town of Chikuzen.

External links
 Chikuzen official website 

Dissolved municipalities of Fukuoka Prefecture
Populated places disestablished in 2005
2005 disestablishments in Japan